Hagerman may refer to:

Places
Hagerman, Idaho
Hagerman, New Mexico
Hagerman, New York
Hagerman National Wildlife Refuge

Other uses
Hagerman (surname)
Hagerman (LIRR station)
Hagerman Pass, mountain pass of Colorado, United States

See also
Hagerman horse, prehistoric horse